E3 ubiquitin-protein ligase SHPRH is an enzyme that in humans is encoded by the SHPRH gene.

Function 

SHPRH is a ubiquitously expressed protein that contains motifs characteristics of several DNA repair proteins, transcription factors, and helicases.[supplied by OMIM]

References

Further reading